The 1971 European Cup Winners' Cup Final was a football match contested by Chelsea of England and Real Madrid of Spain. It was the final match of the 1970–71 competition and the 11th European Cup Winners' Cup final in all.

Route to the final

Match review
The Spanish club were challenging for their seventh European trophy overall (all six previous were European Cups), a record among European clubs at the time, while the West Londoners were seeking their first ever European honour. The final took place on 19 May 1971 and was staged at Karaiskakis Stadium in Piraeus, Greece, which was filled to capacity by traveling fans of both clubs as well as local football aficionados. Chelsea went ahead with a Peter Osgood left-foot volley from inside the area, after a Boyle-Cooke combination, but Real, demonstrating their "exceptional ball skills", pressed back and eventually equalised in the last minute with Ignacio Zoco. There were no further goals scored in extra time, so the final went to a replay game.

The replay was staged at the same venue two days later, on a Friday, with markedly lower attendance. Most of the clubs' fans had left, having booked return tickets on the assumption that, as usual, the final would be decided in one game, although a number of Chelsea's followers stayed on, "sleeping in the rough" around the city. Chelsea scored two goals with Peter Osgood and John Dempsey in the first half. Real's Sebastián Fleitas scored 15 minutes before the end of the game but Chelsea hung on to win 2–1 and become the third London club to win the trophy.

Match

Details

Replay

See also
1971 European Cup Final
1971 Inter-Cities Fairs Cup Final
1998 UEFA Super Cup – contested between same teams
Chelsea F.C. in international football competitions
Real Madrid CF in international football competitions

References

External links
1971 European Cup Winners' Cup Final at UEFA.com

3
Cup Winners' Cup Final 1971
International club association football competitions hosted by Greece
Cup Winners' Cup Final 1971
1971
Cup
UEFA
May 1971 sports events in Europe